Sonai (Pron:/'sə(ʊ)'nʌɪ/সোনাই) is a town in the Cachar district in the Indian state of Assam. It is also the name of a circle and block in the town. Government of Assam declared it as a municipal area on 2016 with 11 wards. The River Sonai flows through the town of Sonai joining with Barak River near Dungripar Village of Sonai. The Chandragiri Park and an Archeological site, a temple of Kachari Kingdom at Shivtilla (Changutilla) near Madhab Chandra Das College (MCD College) is a famous place to visit.

Geography
It is located 18.5 km from District Headquarters Silchar.

Demographics
As per the 2011 census of India, Sonai had a total population of 324,315, of which 51% were male and 49% were female. Sonai has an average literacy rate of 80%, with a male literacy rate of 54% and female literacy rate of 46%.

Division
There is one Revenue Circle containing 203 Revenue Villages and three Development Blocks: Sonai Development Block, Narsingpur Development Block and Palonghat Development Block.

Education
The institution of Barak Valley like National Institute of Technology, Silchar, Assam University, Silchar Campus, and Silchar Medical College and Hospital falls under Sonai (Vidhan Sabha constituency).

Colleges
 Madhab Chandra Das College
 Janata College, Kabuganj, Sonai
Presidency Junior College
 Horizon Junior College
 A P J Abdulkalam Junior College
 Sonai Junior College
 Kabuganj Junior College
 Barak Horizon Junior College

Schools
Government/Provisionalised Schools
 Sonai Nitya Gopal Higher Secondary School
 Moinul Hoque Choudhury Higher Secondary School
 Sonai Senior Madrassa
 Ram Dulal Roy Higher Secondary school
 Satkarakandi High School
 East Kazidhar High School
 Sonai Jubati Singha Manipuri High School
 Abid Raja M E school
 Sonai Madya Banga School
 Bagpur High School
 Sonai M E School
 Swadhin Bazar High School
 Amtola M E School
 Monohar Ali High School
 182 No. Sonai Model Primary School
 Sonai MV School
Private Schools

 Holy Light English School
 Sonai Adarsha Vidya Niketan
 Gyan Kamal Vidyalaya
 Iqra Academy
 Swadeshi Vidyalaya
 Gyan Vikash School
 Woodland English School
 Pally Unnoyon Vidyalaya
 A.K. Azad and F.A. Memorial School
 New Millennium English School
 Brighter English School
 Bidya Bawan
 Sonai Vidya Bhavan
 Sona Vidya Peet
 Sonai Navajyoti Gyanpith

Transport

Air Port 
Kumbhirgram - Silchar Airport

IATA Code: IXS

IATA Code: IXS

Address: Silchar Airport, Kumbhirgram Airport Road, Silchar – 788109, Assam

Rail
No railway stations are nearby. However, Silchar Railway Station is 20 kilometers away.

Road
The national highway NH 306 passes through the town and connects to Mizoram State and Sonai Road.

Politics
Sonai is part of Silchar Lok Sabha constituency. It is also a part of Sonai (Vidhan Sabha constituency).

Notable people 

 Moinul Hoque Choudhury, Former Minister of Industrial Development, Government of India
 Aminul Haque Laskar, Deputy Speaker of Assam Leglestive Assembly

List of MLA's of Sonai 

 1951: Nanda Kishore Sinha, Indian National Congress
 1957: Nanda Kishore Sinha, Indian National Congress
 1962: Pulakeshi Singh, Indian National Congress
 1967: M. M. Choudhury, Indian National Congress
 1972: Nurul Haque Choudhury, Indian National Congress
 1978: Altaf Hossain Mazumdar, Janata Party
 1980: Nurul Haque Choudhury, Indian National Congress
 1985: Abdul Rob Laskar, Indian National Congress
 1991: Badrinarayan Singh, Bharatiya Janata Party
 1996: Anwar Hussain Laskar, Asom Gana Parishad
 2001: Anwar Hussain Laskar, Samajwadi Party
 2006: Kutub Ahmed Mazumder, Indian National Congress
 2011: Anamul Haque, Indian National Congress
 2016: Aminul Haque Laskar, Bharatiya Janata Party
 2021: Karim Uddin Barbhuiya, All India United Democratic Front

References

Cities and towns in Cachar district